Sorin Constantin Pană  (born 28 November 1981 in Bucharest) is a Romanian former footballer who played as a defender or midfielder. First match Liga I was against Sportul Studențesc. His older brother is Silviu Pană from CS Concordia Chiajna.

External links
 
 
 

1981 births
Living people
Romanian footballers
Association football defenders
Liga I players
FC Gloria Buzău players
CS Otopeni players
CS Concordia Chiajna players